European Modern Pentathlon Championships (European Senior Modern Pentathlon Championships) is main modern pentathlon championships in Europe.

Events
Other European Championships in Modern Pentathlon:

 European U24 Modern Pentathlon Championships
 European Junior Modern Pentathlon Championships
 European Masters Modern Pentathlon Championships
 European Para Modern Pentathlon Championships
 European U17 and 19 Tetrathlon Championships
 European Tetrathlon Cup
 Biathle and Triathle European Championships
 European Laser Run Championships

Senior championships

Medal summary (1987–2022)

See also
 World Modern Pentathlon Championships

References 
2007–2012

Citations

External links 
World Pentathlon

 
Modern pentathlon
Modern pentathlon competitions
Recurring sporting events established in 1987